The Meadows, also known as the Robert Carter Hilliard House, is a historic plantation house located near Battleboro, Nash County, North Carolina.  It dates to the early-19th century, and is a two-story, five bay by two bay, Federal style dwelling with a one-story rear shed addition. It is sheathed in weatherboard, a low-pitched gable roof, and double-shoulder exterior end chimneys.  The front facade features a one-story replacement porch covering the center three bays.

It was listed on the National Register of Historic Places in 1974.

References

Plantation houses in North Carolina
Houses on the National Register of Historic Places in North Carolina
Federal architecture in North Carolina
Houses in Nash County, North Carolina
National Register of Historic Places in Nash County, North Carolina